Spulerina marmarodes is a moth of the family Gracillariidae. It is known from South Africa.

References

Endemic moths of South Africa
Spulerina
Moths of Africa
Moths described in 1961